The Bourj Hammoud Massacre was a bloody armed robbery that took place in a jewelry shop in the Bourj Hammoud quarter, Lebanon, in 1985. Five people lost their lives; the three perpetrators were arrested by the Lebanese Internal Security Forces and sentenced to death but succeeded in escaping from prison and have vanished without trace. They have been spotted 3 decades later, in Vienna capital of Austria, by the families of the victims, using fake identities.

The Massacre 

On 28 March 1985, an armed robbery took place in the "Middle East Diamond Company" head office located in the Bourj Hammoud quarter of the Lebanese capital Beirut. The criminals gunned down in cold blood the five people present in the shop and made off with jewelry to an estimated value of 20 million Lebanese pounds.
The victims were the main share holder and chief manager of "Middle East Diamond Company" Hrant Kurkdjian (60 years old, known among jewelers as "Loulou Hrant"), and his four workers, Hani Zammar (28), Maria Hanna Mikhayel (32), Khatoun Tekeyan (27) and Avedik Boyadjian (60).

The police discovered the five bodies lying in a pool of blood. The crime shook Lebanese society to the core; the media called it "the massacre of Bourj Hammoud".
It was considered "the bloodiest, most serious crime in Lebanese criminal history".

The Criminals

Their Arrest 

Fifteen days after the crime took place, the police arrested two people: Raffi Assadour Nahabedian (25) and Panos Assadour Nahabadian (27). The spoils were found hidden in Raffi Assadour Nahabedian's apartment: 3172 grams of 18-carat gold, 495 grams of diamonds (2400 carats), 3244 US dollars and gemstones worth 700 000 US dollars.
The value of the stolen goods was estimated at 20 million Lebanese pounds
The two men were interrogated by Mount Lebanon public prosecutor M. Maurice Khawam and confessed to their crime. They had bagged the jewels in preparation for quitting Lebanon for Europe, where they intended to live the high life. 
On 17 April, the third perpetrator, Hratch Assadour Nahabedian, was arrested by Interpol  at Larnaca airport in Cyprus as he was preparing to flee to Europe himself. He had a number of stolen diamonds on his person. He was extradited to Lebanon.

The Investigation 

The three perpetrators of the Bourj Hammoud massacre were brothers. They used to work with the jewellery shop owner, Hrant Kurkdjian, making jewellery to order in their own shop. 
The stolen goods found during the investigation in Raffi Nahabedian's apartment, as well as neighbours’ testimony, proved that Panos, Raffi and Hratch Nahabedian had planned the attack with robbery in mind. They clearly admitted to having abused the trust of Hrant Kurkdjian and his workers to enter the jewellery shop easily and without suspicion through an electric gate. They were very well known to the owner and the four other victims. Not for a moment did the worker who opened the gate suspect he was letting in his own killers. 
The three brothers admitted to having killed everyone present in the jewellery shop so as to obliterate any evidence or testimony against them. They did not wish to leave behind any witnesses who might have recognized them. Hratch Nahabedian personally admitted to firing at the five people with a silenced revolver.
In the end of April 1985, the case was transferred to the Lebanese Military Court, one of the murderers being a soldier in the Lebanese Armed Forces.

Raphael Boghossian Indictment
Later the 3 Nahabedian brothers accused the partner of Kurkdjian, the famous businessman named Raphael Boghossian (1925-2012), of conspiring to push them to rob and kill his own partner. Raphael Boghossian who is the father of Albert and Jean Boghossian owners of Villa Empain in Brussels, father in law of the ex-Lebanese Minister of Culture Ghassan Salamé, and grandfather of the famous French television presenter Léa Salamé, was arrested on the 5th of August 1985  and jailed. The criminals managed to record some of his words, which they used later to extort money from him. Raphael Boghossian spent 40 days in prison. He was defended by the prominent Lebanese lawyer Nasri Maalouf and was released after paying a Bail of 3 million Lebanese pounds. This amount was considered the highest Bail ever paid in Lebanese history.

The Criminals Flee 

In 1987, before the three brothers could be sentenced, Panos, Raffi and Hratch Nahabedian contrived under mysterious circumstances to escape the prison of Roumieh, where they had been detained by the police since 1985.  
An international warrant was out for their arrest.

The Sentence 

On 10 December 1994, after 9 years of trial, the Lebanese court sentenced Panos, Raffi and Hratch Nahabedain in absentia to death, commuted by the law of 84/91 to life imprisonment with hard labour. The Court declared Raphael Boghossian not guilty, the proofs provided by the 3 criminals not being sufficient to condemn him.

Revelations in 2019 
In December 2019, the Spanish daily El Mundo published an investigation revealing the outcome of the case. The three escapees had rebuilt their lives under false identities in Vienna (Austria) where they ran a jewelry shop in Führichgasse street and obtained Austrian nationality. The shop deals with famous clients like Albert II, Prince of Monaco, Beyoncé, Melanie Griffith, Ekaterina, wife of the billionaire Michael Mucha, German model Angelina Kirsch, Austrian violinist Lidia Baich, Somali writer Waris Dirie, Georgian dancer Katevan Papava and a good part of the cast of the Vienna State Ballet and Vienna State Opera.    Raffi, who died on December 12, 2012, is buried in a Viennese cemetery. It appears that the Viennese police had known the true identity of at least one of the three brothers since 2016 but had not acted on it, due to the lack of extradition agreements between Austria and  Lebanon.
In 2020, the Austrian weekly magazine Profil, interviewed one of the brothers, who agreed being present in the jewelry store on the day of the crime, but denied being the murderer of the 5 persons.  
The families of the victims are joining forces to arrest the perpetrators. They have hired a lawyer in Vienna: the former public prosecutor Norbert Haslhofer who gives the investigation its decisive turn. 
They plan to continue the legal proceedings against the two brothers claiming their deprivation of Austrian nationality. They have reported having received threats, they started also a petition addressed to the Austrian minister of Interior Mag. Gerhard Karner and of Justice Dr. Alma Zadić.  
The Austrian Falter newspaper and ABC Australia published in May and July 2022, articles, revealing that the Austrian citizenship of at least one of the criminals, Panos Nahabedian, was already canceled: Panos was stripped of his citizenship because of false declarations and his entry into the territory with a woman's passport.

References 

Robberies
Matn District
1985 murders in Lebanon
1980s in Beirut